The 1959 Hardin–Simmons Cowboys football team was an American football team that represented Hardin–Simmons University in the Border Conference during the 1959 NCAA University Division football season. In its fifth and final season under head coach Sammy Baugh, the team compiled a 3–7 record (2–2 against conference opponents), tied for third place in the conference, and was outscored by a total of 244 to 154. The team played its three home games at Public Schools Stadium in Abilene, Texas.

No Hardin-Simmons players were named to the 1959 All-Border Conference football team.

Schedule

References

Hardin-Simmons
Hardin–Simmons Cowboys football seasons
Hardin-Simmons Cowboys football